"Betrayal" is the third episode of the American television series "Revenge", it premiered on ABC on October 5, 2011.

The episode was written by Salvatore Stabile and directed by Matt Earl Beesley.

Plot
With the help of Nolan Ross (Gabriel Mann), Emily Thorne (Emily VanCamp) sets her sights on federal prosecutor Tom Kingsley (Yancey Arias), now a state senator, who put her father (James Tupper) in prison. Daniel (Josh Bowman) finds he cannot resist Emily; she orchestrates another date on which Daniel is confronted by the brother of his ex-girlfriend who was involved in his car accident.

Victoria (Madeleine Stowe) learns more about Emily, and her suspicions increase. Victoria reflects on time when she was in love with David Clarke (Tupper) and saw that he would certainly be convicted. She had told Kingsley she had evidence exonerating him, which Kingsley ignored when Conrad (Henry Czerny) offered to support his political ambitions.

Kingsley receives two video e-mails showing him with his ex-mistress Erin (Kim Swennen), to whom he had given money for an abortion. Later at a fundraiser that Victoria had thrown for him, a still-pregnant Erin appears, smiling happily; meanwhile, messages appear on the tablet computer of an astonished Kingsley, blackmailing him into retirement from political life. It is later revealed that Emily released the videos of Kingsley and Erin to the press. When Nolan asks why, she says, "I didn't want to just destroy his career. I wanted to destroy his life."

Production
The episode was written by supervising producer Salvatore Stabile, while CSI: Miami veteran Matt Earl Beesley directed.

Ratings
The episode scored a 2.4 adults 18-49 rating and 7.69 million viewers.

References

External links 
 

Revenge (TV series) episodes
2011 American television episodes